Sphaerioeme rubristerna is a species of beetle in the family Cerambycidae, the only species in the genus Sphaerioeme.

References

Elaphidiini